Buja ( or ) is a comune (municipality) in the   Italian region Friuli-Venezia Giulia, located about  northwest of Trieste and about  northwest of Udine.

Buja borders the following municipalities: Artegna, Colloredo di Monte Albano, Gemona del Friuli, Majano, Osoppo, Treppo Grande.

History 
According to a 12-century copy of a document dated August 4th, 792, Buja (Boga) was donated to Patriarch Paulinus II of Aquileia by Charlemagne. In 1371, Patriarch Marquard of Randeck granted Buia its own communal statues, establishing a Council of Twenty-Four which annually elected a mayor from its membership.

Twin towns — sister cities
Buja is twinned with:

  Aprilia, Italy, since 1997
  Vilsbiburg, Germany, since 2001
  Domont, France, since 2008

References

External links
 Official website

Cities and towns in Friuli-Venezia Giulia